Lamine Diatta (born 2 July 1975) is a Senegalese former professional footballer who played as a defender. He works as team coordinator of Senegal, appointed by head coach Aliou Cissé in 2015.

Club career
Born in Dakar, Senegal, Diatta moved to France when he was only one year old.

Before moving to Olympique Lyon in 2004, Diatta played 142 games for Stade Rennais, scoring nine goals in that time. Before his time at Rennes, he was at Marseille, but never actually played a game for them. Diatta's first club was Toulouse FC. He spent one season there and played 25 games without scoring. In his first year (2004–05) with Lyon he played 19 games. During his second year (2005–06) at Lyon, he was troubled with injury and only makes 13 appearances also without goals. In August 2006, he left Lyon on free transfer in search for regular team football, settling at AS Saint-Étienne.

On 7 March 2008, after a week's trial at Newcastle United, Diatta agreed to a short-term deal until the end of the season after buying out his contract at Beşiktaş J.K. The deal was finally confirmed by the club on 14 March after a week of confusion. He made his first team debut for Newcastle as a substitute in a Premier League match against Reading on 5 April but was released on 15 May.

Diatta joined Stoke City on trial in January 2009. On 20 March, however, he signed for Hamilton Academical on a short-term deal until the end of the season.

After just one month, on 25 April, the 33-year-old Senegalese defender left Hamilton to join Al-Ahli Sports Club in Qatar.

Without a club since his release from Al-Ahli Sports Club he participated in trials in Singapore without being snapped up by a club.

He then joined Étoile Sportive du Sahel of the CLP-1 in Tunisia.

In December 2011 he signed a short-term deal with Championship team Doncaster Rovers, where fellow countrymen El Hadji Diouf and Habib Beye also played for the club.

International career
Being the Senegal's captain, he has played 71 games for his national side, scoring four goals. He also played in all of Senegal's matches in the 2002 FIFA World Cup.

Style of play
Diatta was the holding force in the centre of Senegal's defence, and is also tough in the air, which provides a threat in attacking set-pieces.

Honours
Lyon
 Ligue 1: 2004–05, 2005–06
 Trophée des Champions: 2005

Senegal
Africa Cup of Nations runner-up: 2002

References

External links
 

1975 births
Footballers from Dakar
Living people
Association football central defenders
Senegalese footballers
French footballers
French sportspeople of Senegalese descent
Senegal international footballers
Senegalese expatriate footballers
Expatriate footballers in France
Expatriate footballers in Turkey
Expatriate footballers in England
Expatriate footballers in Scotland
Expatriate footballers in Qatar
Toulouse FC players
Olympique de Marseille players
Stade Rennais F.C. players
Olympique Lyonnais players
AS Saint-Étienne players
Beşiktaş J.K. footballers
Newcastle United F.C. players
Hamilton Academical F.C. players
Doncaster Rovers F.C. players
Ligue 1 players
Premier League players
English Football League players
Al Ahli SC (Doha) players
Étoile Sportive du Sahel players
Süper Lig players
2002 FIFA World Cup players
2004 African Cup of Nations players
2006 Africa Cup of Nations players
2008 Africa Cup of Nations players
2002 African Cup of Nations players
Senegalese expatriate sportspeople in England
Senegalese expatriate sportspeople in Scotland
Expatriate footballers in Tunisia
Qatar Stars League players